Bongolo Dam may refer to:

 Bongolo Dam (South Africa)
Bongolo Dam (Gabon)